Hoover may refer to:

Music
 Hoover (band), an American post-hardcore band
 Hooverphonic, a Belgian band originally named Hoover
 Hoover (singer), Willis Hoover, a country and western performer active in 1960s and '70s
 "Hoover" (song), a 2016 song by Swedish rapper Yung Lean
 Hoover sound, a heavy bass driven drone sound used in electronic music
 Hoover (composer), Katherine Hoover an American contemporary classical music and chamber music composer.

People 
 Hoover (surname)
 Herbert Hoover, 31st president of the United States
 J. Edgar Hoover (1895–1972), first director of the Federal Bureau of Investigation (FBI)
 Hoover Orsi (born 1978), Brazilian race car driver
 Hoover J. Wright (1928–2003), American football and track and field coach

Places in the United States
 Hoover, Alabama
 Hoover, Indiana
 Hoover, Missouri
 Hoover, Oklahoma
 Hoover, South Dakota
 Hoover, Texas
 Hoover Dam, on the Colorado River, Nevada and Arizona
 Hoover Dam (Ohio), on the Big Walnut Creek
 Hoover Field, Washington, D.C.'s first airport, located where the Pentagon now stands
 Hoover Tower, an  structure on the campus of Stanford University

Schools
 Hoover High School (disambiguation)
 Hoover Elementary School (disambiguation)

Other uses
 The Hoover Company, a manufacturer of appliances, especially vacuum cleaners
 Vacuum cleaner, called by the generic term hoover in some countries
 D&B Hoovers, a business information company based in Austin, Texas, US
 Hoover (film), a 2000 American drama film
 Hoover (seal), a harbor seal that learned to imitate basic human speech
 Hoover index, Edgar Malone Hoover's inequality measure
 Lockheed S-3 Viking, nicknamed Hoover
 Operation Hoover
 Hoover Institution, a public-policy think tank at Stanford University founded by Herbert Hoover, later US president
 Hoover League, created by the Republican Party to campaign for the re-election of U.S. president Herbert Hoover

See also
 Hoover Building, in London, England originally a Hoover Company factory
 Hoover House (disambiguation)
 
 Hover (disambiguation)
 Huber, a German surname (Anglicized form is Hoover)